Fotbal Club FCSB II, commonly known as FCSB II is a Romanian football club from Bucharest. The team was founded in 2004, dissolved in 2011 and refounded in 2016. It is the reserve team of FCSB.

Honours
Liga III:
Winners (1): 2008–09
Runners-up (1): 2020–21

Players

Second team squad

Out on loan

Club officials

Board of directors

Current technical staff

League history

Notes

References

External links

FC Steaua București at UEFA
FC Steaua București at teamsandplayers.com

Steaua Bucuresti
2004 establishments in Romania
Football clubs in Bucharest

Liga II clubs
Liga III clubs
Military association football clubs in Romania